Crisco Branch is a  long 2nd order tributary to the Rocky River in Union County, North Carolina.  This is the only stream of this name in the United States.

Course
Crisco Branch rises about 0.5 miles west-southwest of New Salem, North Carolina and then flows north-northeast to join the Rocky River about 3 miles north-northeast of New Salem.

Watershed
Crisco Branch drains  of area, receives about 48.0 in/year of precipitation, has a wetness index of 414.50, and is about 42% forested.

References

Rivers of North Carolina
Rivers of Union County, North Carolina